Trimmatothelopsis is a genus of lichen-forming fungi in the family Acarosporaceae.

Species
Trimmatothelopsis americana 
Trimmatothelopsis benedarensis 
Trimmatothelopsis coreana 
Trimmatothelopsis dispersa 
Trimmatothelopsis gordensis 
Trimmatothelopsis montana 
Trimmatothelopsis oreophila 
Trimmatothelopsis rhizobola 
Trimmatothelopsis sphaerosperma 
Trimmatothelopsis terricola 
Trimmatothelopsis versipellis

References

Verrucariales
Lecanoromycetes genera
Lichen genera
Taxa named by Georg Hermann Zschacke
Taxa described in 1934